Timiryazevskaya is a station on the Serpukhovsko–Timiryazevskaya line of the Moscow Metro. It is named after the neighboring Timiryazev Agricultural Academy. Its depth is 63.5 m; it is the only deep level single-vault type station and the third deepest in the Moscow Metro, after Park Pobedy and Fonvizinskaya. It was opened on March 7, 1991, as a part of a major northern extension of the line. It was the deepest station in Moscow Metro from 1991 until opening of Park Pobedy in 2003.

Timiryazevskaya has exits to Dmitrovskoye Highway and the Timiryazevskaya station of the Savyolovo railway. The station provides transfer to commuter trains serving destinations to the north of Moscow. The eponymous western terminus of the Moscow Monorail line is located near the entrance to the station. Daily passenger flow is about 60,000.

References

External links 
 metro.ru
 KartaMetro.info – Station location and exits on Moscow map (English/Russian)

Moscow Metro stations
Railway stations in Russia opened in 1991
Serpukhovsko-Timiryazevskaya Line
Railway stations located underground in Russia